The Holy Lavra of Saint Sabbas, known in Arabic and Syriac as Mar Saba and historically as the Great Laura of Saint Sabas, is a Greek Orthodox monastery overlooking the Kidron Valley in the Bethlehem Governorate of Palestine, in the West Bank, at a point halfway between Bethlehem and the Dead Sea. The monks of Mar Saba and those of subsidiary houses are known as Sabaites.

Mar Saba is considered to be one of the oldest (almost) continuously inhabited monasteries in the world, and it maintains many of its ancient traditions. One in particular is the restriction on women entering the main compound. The only building that women can enter is the Women's Tower, near the main entrance.

History

Byzantine period
The monastery was founded by Sabbas the Sanctified in 483, on the eastern side of the Kidron Valley, where - according to the monastery's own website - the first seventy hermits gathered around the hermitage of St Sabbas. Later on, the laura relocated to the opposite, western side of the gorge, where the Church of Theoktistos was built in 486 and consecrated in 491 (today rededicated to St Nicholas). The constant growth of the community meant that soon after, in 502, the Church of the God-bearing Virgin Mary, in Greek Theotokos, was built to serve as the main church of the monastery. Saint Sabbas' Typikon, the set of rules applied at the Great Laura and recorded by the saint, eventually became the worldwide model of monastic life and liturgical order known as the Byzantine Rite.

St John of Damascus
Mar Saba was the home of St John of Damascus (676–749), a key religious figure in the Iconoclastic Controversy, who, around 726, wrote letters to the Byzantine emperor Leo III the Isaurian refuting his edicts prohibiting the veneration of icons (images of Christ or other Christian religious figures). Born to a prominent Damascence political family, John worked as a high financial officer to the Umayyad Caliph Abd al-Malik; he eventually felt a higher calling and migrated to the Judaean desert, where he was tonsured and was ordained a hieromonk (monastic priest) at the Monastery of Mar Saba. St. John's tomb lies in a cave under the monastery.

Early Muslim period
Ancient sources describe an Arab attack on the monastery in 797, leading to the massacre of twenty monks. The community seems to have also suffered under the persecutions of calip al-Hakim in 1009 as well as Turkmen raids in the 11th century but experienced occasional phases of peace as can be seen by the scribal and artistic activities.

Mar Saba was the home of the famous Georgian monk and scribe Ioane-Zosime, who moved before 973 to Saint Catherine's Monastery taking several parchment manuscripts with him.

Crusader period
The monastery kept its importance during the existence of the Catholic Kingdom of Jerusalem established by Crusaders in 1099.

Mamluk and Ottoman periods
In 1504, the Serbian monastic community of Palestine, based out of the fourteenth century monastery of St. Michael the Archangel, purchased Mar Saba, which at the time was abandoned due to Bedouin raids. The Serbs controlled the monastery until the late 1630s, and the significant financial support the monastery received from the Tsar of Russia allowed them to run the monastery semi-independently from the Patriarch of Jerusalem, the monastery's nominal overseer (much to the vexation of the patriarchate). The Serbs' control of Mar Saba allowed them to play an important role in the politics of the Orthodox Church of Jerusalem, often siding with the Arabic laity and priests against the Greeks who dominated the episcopate. Serbian control of the monastery eventually ended in the 1600s when the monastery got into massive debt due to the simultaneous combination of a massive building program at the monastery and a cutting off of financial support from Russia due to the outbreak of the Time of Troubles. The Serbs were forced to sell the monastery to the Patriarch of Jerusalem in order to pay off their debts.

Modern period
Today, the complex houses 9 monks.

Significance
The monastery, considered among the oldest continuously inhabited in the Christian world, has been a place of learning and has exerted an important influence in doctrinal developments in the Byzantine Church. Important personalities in this regard included Saint Sabbas himself, John of Damascus (676–749), and the brothers Theodorus and Theophanes (770s–840s).

The monastery is important in the historical development of the liturgy of the Orthodox Church in that the monastic Typicon (manner of celebrating worship services) of Saint Sabbas became the standard throughout the Orthodox Church and those Eastern Catholic Churches under the Pope which follow the Byzantine Rite. The Typicon took the standard form of services which were celebrated in the Patriarchate of Jerusalem and added some specifically monastic usages which were local traditions at Saint Sabbas. From there it spread to Constantinople, and thence throughout the Byzantine world. Although this Typicon has undergone further evolution, particularly at the Monastery of the Stoudion in Constantinople, it is still referred to as the Typicon of Saint Sabbas. A tradition states that this monastery will host the last Divine Liturgy on earth before the parousia of Jesus Christ, therefore the last pillar of true Christianity.

Relics
The monastery holds the relics of Saint Sabbas. The relics were seized by Latin crusaders in the 12th century and remained in Italy until Pope Paul VI returned them to the monastery in 1965 as a gesture of repentance and good will towards Orthodox Christians.

Manuscripts
Mar Saba is where Morton Smith purportedly found a copy of a letter ascribed to Clement of Alexandria containing excerpts of a so-called Secret Gospel of Mark, and was for several centuries home to the Archimedes Palimpsest.

Access
Women are only allowed to come to the main entrance, but without entering the walled compound.

The monastery is closed for visitors on Wednesdays and Fridays (the fasting days of the week).

Gallery

List of abbots
There are gaps in this list. Prior to the 18th century, dates are years when the abbot (or hegumen) is known to have held office and not the start and end dates. From the 18th century on, the dates indicate the start of an abbot's term, which usually lasted two years at first, longer later on. The official list goes back to 1704, but still has gaps.

Notes

See also
 War of Saint Sabas
 Serapheim Savvaitis
 Theodorus and Theophanes called the Grapti (770s–840s), monks educated at Mar Saba, opponents of iconoclasm

Notes

References

Bibliography

 (pp. 219, 232)
 (pp. 92- 101)
 (pp. 14-19)
 (p. 347)
 (pp. 258-268)
 (pp. 26, 249)
 (Robinson and Smith, 1841, vol 3, 2nd appendix, p. 123)

External links
Survey of Western Palestine, Map 18: IAA, Wikimedia commons
Photos of Mar Saba at the Manar al-Athar photo archive

Ancient churches in the Holy Land
Christian monasteries established in the 5th century
5th-century establishments in the Byzantine Empire
439 establishments
Greek culture
Greek Orthodox monasteries
Church buildings in the Kingdom of Jerusalem
Culture of Georgia (country)
Christian monasteries in the West Bank
Greek Orthodoxy in the State of Palestine
Eastern Orthodox church buildings in the State of Palestine
Tourist attractions in the State of Palestine
Lavras